Charnay may refer to:

 Désiré Charnay (1828-1915), a French traveller and archaeologist

Charnay is the name or part of the name of several communes in France:

 Charnay, in the Doubs département
 Charnay, in the Rhône département
 Charnay-lès-Chalon, in the Saône-et-Loire département
 Charnay-lès-Mâcon, in the Saône-et-Loire département